The Ruthin and Cerrig-y-Drudion Railway was a proposed  narrow gauge railway that would have linked the towns of Ruthin and Cerrig-y-Drudion in Denbighshire, Wales. A bill was put before Parliament in 1873, promoting the railway, which was intended to meet the planned branch of the North Wales Narrow Gauge Railways from Beddgelert at Cerrig-y-Drudion.

Although the bill was withdrawn, a second Act was successfully passed in June 1876. Some construction work started in 1879, but was abandoned in 1884.

References 
 
 

Closed railway lines in Wales
Railway companies established in 1873
Railway companies disestablished in 1884
British companies disestablished in 1884
British companies established in 1873